Lyon & Healy Harps, Inc. is an American musical instrument manufacturer based in Chicago, Illinois and is a subsidiary of Salvi Harps. Today best known for concert harps, the company's Chicago headquarters and manufacturing facility contains a showroom and concert hall. George W. Lyon and Patrick J. Healy began the company in 1864 as a sheet music shop. By the end of the 19th century, they manufactured a wide range of musical instruments—including not only harps, but pianos, guitars, mandolins, banjos, ukuleles and various brass and other percussion instruments.

Today, Lyon & Healy harps are widely played by professional musicians, since they are one of the few makers of harps for orchestral use—which are known as concert harps or pedal harps. Lyon & Healy also makes smaller folk harps or lever harps (based on traditional Irish and Scottish instruments) that use levers to change string pitch instead of pedals. In the 1980s, Lyon & Healy also began to manufacture electroacoustic harps and, later, solid body electric harps.

History

George W. Lyon, a native of Northborough, Massachusetts; and Patrick J. Healy, born in Mallow, Ireland, founded the company in 1864, after they moved from Boston to start a sheet music shop for music publisher Oliver Ditson. Determining Lyon & Healy's history is complicated because its building and company records were destroyed in two fires, including the Great Chicago Fire of 1871. Two smaller fires did little damage to the firm and did not result in data loss.

Company letters and trade catalogs don't provide exact dates that would reveal when Lyon & Healy began manufacturing instruments. An article in the Musical Courier states that Lyon & Healy began manufacturing instruments in 1885. Clearly, Lyon & Healy was making fretted string instruments in the 1880s, with Washburn (guitars, mandolins, banjos, and zithers) as their premier line. By the 1900s, if not earlier, Lyon & Healy might well have been manufacturing bowed string instruments.

According to Vintage Guitar magazine,  "Circa 1900, the firm was so large it manufactured under a host of sub-brands; Washburn is perhaps the most recognized, though Leland, Lakeside, and American Conservatory are still seen." 

Lyon & Healy also made various percussion instruments. Later, Lyon & Healy began manufacturing brass instruments, possibly as early as the 1890s. Lyon & Healy also repaired instruments, and offered engraving services. Complicating matters still further, Lyon & Healy engraved instruments that it retailed but did not actually manufacture. In its 1892 catalog, it claimed that it manufactured 100,000 instruments annually.

For a period of time, 1876 to the Great Depression, the "Golden Age" of piano making, the company hand made pianos and reed organs in addition to harps. Like their harps, Lyon & Healy put the highest quality and craftsmanship in building these instruments. In addition to making grand pianos, George W. Lyon patented his cottage upright in 1878. Its top-of-the-line pianos were sold under the Lyon & Healy name. Their pianos have been described as being remarkably powerful, clear, and having a singing tone. Some have compared the Lyon & Healy grand pianos to other high end brands of the time such as Steinway & Sons, Wm. Knabe & Co., and Sohmer. Lower cost pianos were sold by Lyon & Healy under various other brand names. Like most other Golden Age piano companies, they stopped making pianos during the Great Depression.

Lyon retired in 1889 and Healy became the company's first president. That year, Lyon & Healy built their first harp. Healy wanted to develop a harp better suited to the rigors of the American climate than available European models.  They successfully produced a harp notable for its strength, pitch reliability, and freedom from unwanted vibration. Previously, most harps in North America were made by small groups of craftsmen in France, England, Ireland, or Italy.

In 1890, Lyon & Healy introduced the Style 23 Harp, still a popular and recognizable design. It has 47 strings, highly decorative floral carving on the top of the column, base, and feet, and a fleur de lis pattern at the bottom of the column. It is available in a gold version. Lyon & Healy produces one of the most ornate and elaborate harps in the world, the Louis XV, which includes carvings of leaves, flowers, scrolls, and shells along its neck and kneeblock, as well the soundboard edges.

Lyon would later form a new company with E.A. Potter called Lyon & Potter, and remained there until his death on January 12, 1894. Healy died of pneumonia on April 3, 1905.

In the 1890s the company—which used the slogan,"Everything in music"—began building pipe organs. In 1894 Robert J. Bennett came to Lyon & Healy from the Hutchings company of Boston to head their organ department. The largest surviving Lyon & Healy pipe organ is at the Our Lady of Sorrows Basilica in Chicago. It is a large organ of four manuals and 57 ranks of pipes.

They also made small pipe organs. An example survives at St. Mary's Catholic Church in Aspen Colorado. It is a two manual tracker with a 30 note straight pedalboard and 7 ranks. It is believed to have been built around 1900, and can still be pumped by hand.

By the 1900s, Lyon & Healy was one of the largest music publishers in the world, and was a major producer of musical instruments. However, In late 1920s, Lyon & Healy sold its brass musical instrument manufacturing branch (see "New Langwill Index"). In the 1970s, the firm concentrated solely upon making and selling harps.

In 1928, Lyon & Healy introduced one of the most unusual harps ever mass-produced, the Salzedo Model. The company designed it in collaboration with the harpist Carlos Salzedo. It an Art Deco style instrument that incorporates bold red and white lines on the soundboard to create a stylized and distinct appearance.

In the 1960s, Lyon & Healy introduced a smaller lever harp, the Troubadour, a 36-string harp for young beginners with smaller hands, and for casual players. This harp stands , and weighs .

In the late 1970s, Steinway & Sons (then owned by CBS) purchased Lyon & Healy and soon after closed all retail stores, which sold sheet music and musical instruments, to focus on harp production.

By 1985, Lyon & Healy also made folk harps, also known as Irish harps, which are even smaller than the Troubadour. The "Shamrock model folk harp" has 34 strings. The legs can be removed so the player can hold the instrument lap—style on the knees. It features Celtic designs on the soundboard. An Irish or folk harp player is sometimes called a harper rather than harpist. 

DePaul University now owns the Wabash building. Lyon & Healy harps are still in Chicago, Illinois, at 168 North Ogden Avenue. The building was once home to the recording studios of Orlando R. Marsh.

Craftsmanship
Wood in harp construction varies by instrument, but Sitka Spruce (Picea sitchensis) is the most common soundboard wood. Various Lyon & Healy guitars, mandolins, and many other instrument types reside in major musical instrument museums in the U.S. and Europe.

Lyon and Healy now primarily manufactures four types of harps—the lever harp, petite pedal harp, semi-grande pedal harp, and concert grand harp.  They also make limited numbers of special harps called concert grands. Lyon & Healy makes electric lever harps in nontraditional colors such as pink, green, blue, and red.

Lyon & Healy Corporation 
Lyon & Healy Corporation is a musical product distribution company in North America representing brands such as  Delta, Relish Guitars, SIM1, Paoletti Guitars and Acus Sound Engineering. Lyon & Healy Corporation aims to become the leading provider of premium quality musical instruments and accessories.

See also
 Washburn Guitars
 List of Stradivarius instruments

Notes

External links
Official website for Lyon & Healy

Musical instrument manufacturing companies based in Chicago
Harp makers
Former CBS Corporation subsidiaries
Companies established in 1864